Je n'ai pas vu le temps passer... ("I Didn't See the Time Go By...") is the 28th French studio album by the French-Armenian singer Charles Aznavour, released in 1978.

History
In 1978 the album became No 1 on TOP 50 of France (for 49 weeks).

The album includes songs by Charles Aznavour, Georges Garvarentz and others. It was reissued by EMI.

Track listing 
Avant la guerre
Je n'ai pas vu le temps passer
J'ai vu Paris
Ne t'en fais pas
La chanson du faubourg
Dans ta chambre il y a
Camarade
Les amours médicales
Un corps
Je ne connais que toi

Track listing of the 1995 CD Reissue 
Ave Maria (Charles Aznavour / Georges Garvarentz)
Un Enfant Est Né (Charles Aznavour / Georges Garvarentz)
Je Ne Comprends Pas (Charles Aznavour / Jacques Plante)
Noël d'Autrefois (Charles Aznavour / Jacques Plante)
Papa Calypso (Charles Aznavour / Herbert Kretzmer / Jacques Plante)
Comment C'est Fait La Neige? (Charles Aznavour / Jacques Plante)
Noël à Paris (Charles Aznavour / Jacques Plante)
Un Enfant de Toir Pour Noël (Charles Aznavour / Georges Garvarentz)
Noël au Saloon (Charles Aznavour / Jacques Plante)
Hosanna! (Charles Aznavour)
Avant La Guerre (Charles Aznavour)
Je N'Ai Pas Vu le Temps Passer (Charles Aznavour)
J'Ai Vu Paris (Charles Aznavour)
Ne T'En Fais Pas (Charles Aznavour / Guy Bontempelli)
Camarade (Charles Aznavour / Jacques Plante)

Personnel 
Charles Aznavour - Author, Composer, Vocals
Georges Garvarentz - Composer
Guy Bontempelli - Composer
Aldo Franck - Orchestration
André Gomet - Photography
Herbert Kretzmer - Composer
Peter Duval Lee - Orchestration
Alain Marouani - Photography
Del Newman - Orchestration
Jacques Plante - Composer
Gabriel Yared - Orchestration
 Peter Boita - Drums
 Laurence Juber - Guitar

References

Links
Je n'ai pas vu le temps passer

1978 albums
Charles Aznavour albums
Albums produced by Del Newman